The AAAS Award for Scientific Freedom and Responsibility is given by the American Association for the Advancement of Science and honours scientists and engineers whose exemplary actions, often taken at significant personal cost, have served to foster scientific freedom and responsibility and increased scientific awareness throughout the world. The establishment of this new Award for Scientific Freedom and Responsibility was announced by AAAS executive officer William D. Carey on 23 October 1980. The award, presented for the first time at the 1982 AAAS Annual Meeting in Washington, DC, consisted of a plaque and a cash prize of $1,000. According to the AAAS, these types of exemplary actions include "acting to protect the public's health, safety or welfare; focusing public attention on important potential impacts of science and technology on society by their responsible participation in public policy debates." The 2018 recipient of the AAAS Award for Scientific Freedom and Responsibility was civil and environmental engineer Marc Edwards. The AAAS stated that he was given the award for his ability "to apply his engineering expertise to revealing dangerous levels of lead contamination in water supplies" in the area of Flint Michigan. According to Marc, Flint Michigan "represents misconduct by local and federal government engineers and scientists... and allowed an unprecedented exposure to the best known nerve toxin in the most powerful city in America, and perhaps even the world".

Recipients
 2021 Ricardo Galvão
 2020 Erin Kimmerle 
 2019 Channa Jayasumana, Sarath Gunatilake (to be confirmed)
 2018 Mark Edwards
 2017 Award date adjusted – see 2018
 2016 Kurt Gottfried
 2015 Jean Maria Arrigo
 2014 Omid Kokabee
 2013 Hoosen Coovadia
 2012 Kiyoshi Kurokawa
 2011 J. David Jentsch, Edythe D. London, and Dario Ringach
 2010 Elizabeth Loftus
 2009 Nancy Olivieri
 2008 Drummond Rennie
 2007 James Hansen
 2006 Eugenie Scott, Dover High School Science Department, and R. Wesley McCoy
 2005 David Michaels
 2004 rDNA Advisory Committee
 2003 Walter Reich
 2002 L. Dennis Smith
 2001 Howard K. Schachman
 2000 Alexander Nikitin
 1999 Joel L. Lebowitz
 1998 JoAnn Burkholder
 1997 Salim Kheirbek
 1996 Daniel Callahan
 1995 Vil Mirzayanov
 1994 June E. Osborn, Mathilde Krim
 1993 Daniel L. Albritton, Robert T. Watson
 1992 Inez Austin
 1991 Adrian R. Morrison
 1990 Matthew S. Meselson
 1989 Robert L. Sprague, Natural Resources Defense Council
 1988 Richard L. Garwin, Roger M. Boisjoly
 1987 Stanley L. Weinberg, Norman D. Newell, Francisco J. Ayala
 1986 Colegio Medico de Chile, Victor Paschkis
 1985 Werner A. Baum
 1983 Anatoly Koryagin, Jose Westerkamp
 1982 Paul Berg, Maxine Singer, Norton Zinder, Morris H. Baslow

See also
 AAAS Award for Science Diplomacy
 AAAS Philip Hauge Abelson Prize
 AAAS Prize for Behavioral Science Research
 Newcomb Cleveland Prize

References

External links
 Recipients of the AAAS Award for Scientific Freedom and Responsibility – AAAS
 The American Association for the Advancement of Science (AAAS) Awards – York University
 AAAS Establishes Award for Scientific Freedom and Responsibility – Science. 1980 Dec 5;210(4474):1115-6

Human rights awards
Free expression awards
American awards
Science and technology awards
Awards established in 1982
Award for Scientific Freedom and Responsibility
1982 establishments in the United States